Klondyke may refer to:

Places
Klondyke, Ontario, Canada
The Klondyke, a causeway connecting Coley's Point and Bay Roberts, Newfoundland and Labrador, Canada
the former name for Hazelridge, Manitoba, Canada
an area south of Vang, Bornholm, Denmark
Klondyke Pit, the colloquial name for the former Newcraighall Colliery in Edinburgh, Scotland
Klondyke mill and mine, near Trefriw in north Wales

United States
Klondyke, Arizona
Klondyke School District
Klondyke, Indiana
Klondyke, Parke County, Indiana
Klondyke, Louisiana, the north end of Louisiana Highway 55
Klondyke, Minnesota
a neighbourhood of Asheville, North Carolina
the former spelling for Klondike, Dawson County, Texas

People
 Klondyke Kate (born c. 1962), English professional wrestler
 Klondyke Raaff (1879–1949), South African international rugby union player
a ring name for Sirelda, a Canadian professional wrestler

Other uses
a nickname used for GNR Class C1 (small boiler), a class of steam locomotives
the Klondyke wing of the Royal York Hotel in York, England
King Klondyke, an 1899 silent film; see Stanley Lupino
"Operation Klondyke", an episode of the television series Undercover Customs

See also
Melcher Covered Bridge, also known as the Klondyke Covered Bridge
Klondike (disambiguation)